Space-division multiple access (SDMA) is a channel access method based on creating parallel spatial pipes (focused signal beams) using advanced antenna technology next to higher capacity pipes through spatial multiplexing and/or diversity, by which it is able to offer superior performance in radio multiple access communication systems (where multiple users may need to use the communication media simultaneously). In traditional mobile cellular network systems, the base station has no information on the position of the mobile units within the cell and radiates the signal in all directions within the cell in order to provide radio coverage. This method results in wasting power on transmissions when there are no mobile units to reach, in addition to causing interference for adjacent cells using the same frequency, so called co-channel cells. Likewise, in reception, the antenna receives signals coming from all directions including noise and interference signals. By using smart antenna technology and differing spatial locations of mobile units within the cell, space-division multiple access techniques offer attractive performance enhancements. The radiation pattern of the base station, both in transmission and reception, is adapted to each user to obtain highest gain in the direction of that user. This is often done using phased array techniques.

Use in cellular networks

GSM 
In GSM cellular networks, the base station is aware of the distance (but not direction) of a mobile phone by use of a technique called "timing advance" (TA). The base transceiver station (BTS) can determine how far the mobile station (MS) is by interpreting the reported TA. This information, along with other parameters, can then be used to power down the BTS or MS, if a power control feature is implemented in the network. The power control in either BTS or MS is implemented in most modern networks, especially on the MS, as this ensures a better battery life for the MS. This is also why having a BTS close to the user results in less exposure to electromagnetic radiation.

 to have a BTS close to them as their MS will be powered down as much as possible. For example, there is more power being transmitted from the MS than what one would receive from the BTS even if they were 6 meters away from a BTS mast. However, this estimation might not consider all the Mobile stations that a particular BTS is supporting with EM radiation at any given time.

5G 
In the same manner, 5th generation mobile networks will be focused in using the given position of the MS in relation to BTS in order to focus all MS Radio frequency power to the BTS direction and vice versa, thus enabling power savings for the Mobile Operator, reducing MS SAR index, reducing the EM field around base stations since beam forming will concentrate RF power when it will be used rather than spread uniformly around the BTS, reducing health and safety concerns, enhancing spectral efficiency, and decreased MS battery consumption.

See also
Co-channel interference
Multi-user MIMO (MU-MIMO)
History of smart antennas

References

Channel access methods